= Dolphin Sailing System =

1986 video game

- Publisher: BCI Software
- Platform: PC
- Release: 1986
- Genre: Simulation

Dolphin Sailing System is a 1986 video game published by BCI Software.

== Gameplay ==
Dolphin Sailing System is a game in which the player learns to sail a sailboat.

== Reception ==
Russell Sipe reviewed the game for Computer Gaming World, and stated that "DSS offers a lot of value, especially if you are interesting in sailing beyond the confines of your computer screen."
